Parbatta is a small town in the Khagaria district of Bihar state, India. It is 12 km from the bank of river Ganga.

Banks in Parbatta:
 Allahabad Bank, parbatta ( Ifsc Code : ALLA0211239, micrCode: 851010501)
 Union Bank Of India, Parbatta ( Ifsc Code : UBIN0537055, micrCode: 851026003)

References

Villages in Khagaria district